Syria participated in the 2005 West Asian Games held in Doha, Qatar from December 1, 2005 to December 10, 2005. Syria ranked 3rd with 21 gold medals in this edition of the West Asian Games.

References

West Asian Games
Nations at the 2005 West Asian Games
Syria at the West Asian Games